László Muskát (26 January 1903 – 23 September 1966) was a Hungarian sprinter and hurdler. He competed in three events at the 1924 Summer Olympics.

References

External links
 

1903 births
1966 deaths
Athletes (track and field) at the 1924 Summer Olympics
Hungarian male sprinters
Hungarian male hurdlers
Olympic athletes of Hungary